The K-class was a class of nine trams built by James Moore & Sons for the Prahran & Malvern Tramways Trust (PMTT). All passed to the Melbourne & Metropolitan Tramways Board on 2 February 1920 when it took over the PMTT becoming the K-class retaining their running numbers.

References

Melbourne tram vehicles
600 V DC multiple units